Mojgan Shajarian (born 17 May 1970) is an Iranian-born painter, graphic designer, vocalist, and setar player. She is daughter of musician Mohammad-Reza Shajarian.

Early life and education 
Mojgan Shajarian was born on 17 May 1970 in Tehran. She holds a bachelor's degree in painting, and a master's degree in graphic communication from the Islamic Azad University, and also a bachelor's degree in music from the University of the Arts.

Shajarian is married to Mohammad Ali Rafiei, who was the concert director of Mohammad Reza Shajarian and later Homayoun Shajarian, and has a daughter named Mehr Rafiei and two twin sons named Sam and Sepehr.

Educational background 
 Learning setar with Mohammad-Reza Lotfi and Hossein Alizadeh in 1979
 Learning radif with Parviz Meshkatian in 1981
 Learning radif with Mehrabano Toufigh at the Tehran University of Art in 1989

Shahnaz group 
Mohammad Reza Shajarian founded a music group in 2008 and named it Shahnaz in honor of Jalil Shahnaz (a famous tar player). Mohammad Reza Shajarian works with Mojgan Shajarian's daughters with this group.

Arghavan
Her first independent album was released in April 2019 under the name of Arghavan. This album was composed by Sorena Sefati. In this album, the poems of poets such as Hushang Ebtehaj, Mohammad-Reza Shafiei Kadkani and Hafez have been used. Mojgan Shajarian says about the name of this album: "The name Arghavan tells the story of the suffering of the people of our land, as well as those who have been forced to emigrate but have never taken root in their homeland." Regarding the restrictions on the release of music albums with women's voices in Iran, Mojgan Shajarian published a post on social media: "Due to the unjust laws governing our country, it is not possible to publish Arghavan's album, and for this reason, Arghavan is available for free on the Internet to those interested in Iran."

Artistic activity 
 Performed in a concert with Sima Bina in 1991 in Tehran
 Graphic design of the works of Mohammad-Reza Shajarian and Homayoun Shajarian since 1993
 Solo and Vocal with Shajarian in a concert in London with Shahnaz Group (April 2010) (officially broadcast by BBC)
 Setar playing in the concert of Mohammad-Reza Shajarian and Shahnaz Group in Dubai, Shahnaz Group Concert in Tehran, Rendan-e Mast and Morgh-e Khoshkhan
 In 2019, she was part of Sourena Safati's NuAeen Ensemble, which toured

References

External links 
 

20th-century Iranian women singers
Iranian setar players
Iranian women painters
Iranian graphic designers
1970 births
Living people
Singers from Tehran
21st-century Iranian women singers